Klisman Sousa (born February 12, 1996) is a Cape Verdean professional footballer who plays as a defender who currently plays for amateur club Fall River FC.

Career

College
Sousa spent all four years of his college career at the Providence College between 2015 and 2018, scoring 1 goal and tallying 6 assists in 55 appearances.

Professional
On February 21, 2019, Sousa joined USL Championship side Hartford Athletic ahead of their inaugural season.

On April 11, 2019, Sousa was loaned to USL League One side FC Tucson.

International
In May 2022, Sousa joined the United States national futsal team at training camp in Wesley Chapel, Florida. In October 2022, Sousa was named to the squad for the 2022 Umag Futsal Nations Cup.

References

External links
Providence bio

Living people
1996 births
Cape Verdean footballers
Cape Verdean expatriate footballers
Association football defenders
Providence Friars men's soccer players
Hartford Athletic players
FC Tucson players
Soccer players from Massachusetts
USL League One players
Sportspeople from New Bedford, Massachusetts
American men's futsal players